Cecilia Magnusson (born 1962) is a Swedish politician of the Moderate Party. She was member of the Riksdag from 1998 to 2018.

References

Cecilia Magnusson at the Riksdag website

Members of the Riksdag from the Moderate Party
Living people
1962 births
Women members of the Riksdag
Members of the Riksdag 2002–2006
21st-century Swedish women politicians